Juan García (born 30 March 1965) is a Spanish equestrian. He competed in two events at the 1988 Summer Olympics.

References

1965 births
Living people
Spanish male equestrians
Olympic equestrians of Spain
Equestrians at the 1988 Summer Olympics
Place of birth missing (living people)